The Energy Science and Technology Database (EDB) is a multidisciplinary file containing worldwide references to basic and applied scientific and technical research literature. The information is collected for use by (United States) government managers, researchers at the national laboratories, and other research efforts sponsored by the U.S. Department of Energy, and the results of this research are transferred to the public. Abstracts are included for records from 1976 to the present day.

Nuclear Science Abstracts
The EDB also contains the Nuclear Science Abstracts which is a comprehensive abstract and index collection to the international nuclear science and technology literature for the period 1948 through 1976. Included are scientific and technical reports of the US Atomic Energy Commission, United States Energy Research and Development Administration and its contractors, other agencies, universities, and industrial and research organizations. Approximately 25% of the records in the file contain abstracts. Nuclear Science Abstracts contains over 900,000 bibliographic records. In comparison, the entire Energy Science and Technology Database contains over 3 million bibliographic records.

EDB Scope
Moreover, this database is designed to be a source for any individual who requires  access to worldwide energy related information. This database is applicable to the following:
Obtaining results of current energy research efforts.
Access subject specific information on energy sources, use, and conservation; environmental effects; waste processing and disposal; regulatory consideration, as well as basic scientific studies.
Review energy information from a wide variety of sources, including journal literature, conference, patents, books, monographs, theses, and engineering and software materials.
Access historical records of the US Atomic Energy Commission, and US Energy Research and Development Administration.
Review subject specific information on nuclear science from a wide variety of sources, including books, conference proceedings, papers, patents, dissertations, engineering drawings, and journal literature.

Subject coverage
Subject coverage includes:

Biology
Biomedicine
Chemistry
Coal, Gas, Oil, Hydroelectricity
Conservation technology
Energy Conversion
Energy Policy
Engineering
Environmental Science
Geosciences, Geothermal Energy
Hazardous waste management
Human Genome Project Methodology
Isotope / Radiation technology
Materials Handling
Metals and Ceramics
Renewable Energy Source
Nuclear and Thermonuclear Power
Physics
Synthetic fuels

Sources
A combination of national, and international agencies, as well as multiple non-governmental organizations are the source for, and provide information to, this database. Information is provided through the Energy Technology Data Exchange (ETDE), which is the International Energy Agency's (IEA) multilateral information program, and through the International Atomic Energy Agency's International Nuclear Information System (INIS), and IEA Coal Research. Other source information is provided by the U.S. Department of Energy, its contractors, other government agencies, professional societies.  Engineering and software materials, references to journal literature, conferences, patents, books, monographs, and thesis, make up the files of this database. Approximately 50% of these references are from non-U.S. sources.

See also
List of academic databases and search engines

References

(Dept. of Commerce)

Bibliographic databases and indexes
Energy organizations
Government databases in the United States
Scientific databases
United States Department of Commerce